Dy Saveth (born 1944) is a Cambodian actress and first Miss Cambodia (1959) often referred to as the "actress of tears". She is "one of the most beloved actresses from the 1960s era of Cambodian film".

Biography

A rising star of Cambodian cinema 
Dy Saveth was born in Cambodia in March 4, 1944 in a family of artists where women, at least since her grandmother, had been dancers of the Palace in the Royal Ballet. She obtained her first role as an actress at age 18 in 1962 in Kbuon Chivit  (The Raft of Life), where she not only become famous as the "actress of tears" but also helped the production make a "massive profit", encouraging the movie industry in Cambodia to produce more movies locally. At age 19, Dy Saveth won the first beauty pageant of Miss Cambodia. In 1967, she played with Prince Sihanouk and his wife Monique in a thriller title Ombre sur Angkor (Shadow on Angkor) about the downfall of the gruesome governor of Siem Reap, General Dap Chhuon. She rapidly obtained many new roles in the booming industry of Cambodian cinema, and starred in the 1969 Crepuscule (Twilight) movie, directed by Norodom Sihanouk, thus becoming "one of the best-known faces of the Golden Age of Khmer Cinema".

From actress of tears in the Rose of Pailin to tears in exile and flowers of Paris 
She married Huoy Keng, an actor, producer and film director, during the 1970s. Just as Van Vanak ran his own production company, Huoy Keng and Dy Saveth jointly ran Sovann Kiry. During the Cambodian Civil War, she continued making numerous movies, and played her most famous role in Puos Keng Kang, with her director and mentor Tea Lim Koun. She was invited to join Thai movies as well, working with Thai director Sor Asanajinda in the 1971 film, Rak Kham Kob Fa, in which she sings a duet with Thai actor Sombat Metanee (using voice dubbers), as well as in another Thai movie, Nam Jai Por Kha, in which she shared the screen with Thai actress Aranya Namwong in the sequel to Puos Keng Kang.

After the Khmer Rouge came to power in 1975, Dy Saveth, who was visiting friends in Bangkok during the fall of Phnom Penh, escaped with Huoy Keng to France, while four of her siblings were left to during the Cambodian genocide.

The couple later moved to Hong Kong. There they separated while Keng continued his film business and became one of Hong Kong's first millionaires; meanwhile, Dy Saveth abandoned acting and became a flower arranger with a florist in Paris. She later moved to Nice where she lived for 18 years before returning to Cambodia.

Returning to Cambodia and to acting 
Saveth returned to Cambodia in 1993 and resumed acting, after she was recognized on the street by an employee of the Cambodia National Television, while she was crying for help as a nearby was had caught fire. In 1994, she joined an unreleased film title The Saw Wheel with Cambodian actor Haing Ngor. Dy Saveth has been involved in training a new generation of actors and actresses since returning to Cambodia by teaching performance at the Royal University of Fine Arts, training contemporary Khmer artists such as Leang Seckon, and participating in the Koun Khmer Film Camp. In 2011, she appeared in the documentary Golden Slumbers by filmmaker Davy Chou. In 2012, she made her stage debut in the play Cambodia, Here I Am by Jean-Baptiste Phou, attracting a "keen interest from audiences".

Family 
Dy Saveth is divorced from her ex-husband Houy Keng, with whom she had two children. Dy Saveth also has one adopted daughter.

Legacy

A legendary actress of Cambodia 
With her impressive filmography of more than a hundred films, Dy Saveth is a living legend of Cambodian cinema.

A witness to the lost reels of Cambodian cinema 
Dy Saveth, as one of the rare artists and actresses along with Prum Manh to have survived the Cambodian genocide, has become an important link in the transmission of collective memory in Cambodia.

Filmography 
Dy Saveth was featured in many films throughout the 1960s and 1970s until the communist takeover in 1975, and later from 1993 to present. Dy Saveth has starred in over 100 Cambodian films, most of which were lost due to the Khmer Rouge era, including:

Theater

References

Links 
 
 

Cambodian film actresses
Living people
1944 births
20th-century Cambodian actresses